Bërxull is a village and a former municipality in the Tirana County, central Albania. At the 2015 local government reform it became a subdivision of the municipality Vorë. The population at the 2011 census was 9,883.

References

Administrative units of Vorë
Former municipalities in Tirana County
Villages in Tirana County